Lorne Ferguson (May 26, 1930 — March 28, 2008) was a Canadian ice hockey left winger who played 422 games in the National Hockey League. Born in Palmerston, Ontario, he played for the Boston Bruins, Detroit Red Wings, and Chicago Black Hawks between 1949 and 1959. The rest of his career, which lasted from 1949 to 1970, was spent in the minor leagues.

Career statistics

Regular season and playoffs

External links 
 

1930 births
2008 deaths
Boston Bruins players
Buffalo Bisons (AHL) players
Canadian ice hockey left wingers
Chicago Blackhawks players
Detroit Red Wings players
Guelph Biltmore Mad Hatters players
Hershey Bears players
Kingston Frontenacs (EPHL) players
New York Rovers players
Ontario Hockey Association Senior A League (1890–1979) players
People from Wellington County, Ontario
Quebec Aces (AHL) players
Tulsa Oilers (USHL) players